Bernardo de Sandoval y Rojas (20 April 1546 – 7 December 1618) was a Spanish bishop and cardinal who was Grand Inquisitor of Spain from 1608 to 1618.

Biography

Bernardo de Sandoval y Rojas was born in Aranda de Duero on April 20, 1546, the son of Hernando de Rojas y Sandoval and Maria Chacon Guevara.  He was the second oldest of nine siblings.  He was the uncle of Francisco Gómez de Sandoval, 1st Duke of Lerma.

His uncle, Cristóbal de Rojas y Sandoval, Bishop of Oviedo granted him the tonsure on November 13, 1555.

He attended the University of Alcalá, where he studied under Ambrosio Morales and received his bachillerato on June 18, 1566; his licentiate, October 25, 1567; and a doctorate in arts, November 3, 1567.  He became a canon of Seville Cathedral on June 4, 1574.  His uncle, now Archbishop of Seville, made him subdeacon of El Escorial on June 5, 1576.  During this period, he also attended the University of Salamanca, receiving a licentiate in theology on July 24, 1576.

In 1586, Philip II of Spain nominated him to be Bishop of Ciudad Rodrigo and he was elected bishop by the cathedral chapter of Ciudad Rodrigo on January 8, 1586.  He was consecrated by Cardinal Rodrigo de Castro Osorio, Archbishop of Seville, on April 20, 1586.  He was translated to the see of Pamplona on March 16, 1588.  He became Bishop of Jaén on April 29, 1596.

On March 3, 1599, Pope Clement VIII created him a cardinal priest.  He became Archbishop of Toledo on April 19, 1599.  He received his galero on February 26, 1601, at which time he was granted the titular church of Santa Anastasia.  He did not participate in the two conclaves of 1605.

He was the Grand Inquisitor of Spain from 1608 until his death in 1618.

He was the patron of many famous authors, including Miguel de Cervantes, Francisco de Quevedo, Lope de Vega, Luis de León, and Luis de Góngora.

He died suddenly in Madrid on December 7, 1618.  He is buried in the Cathedral of Toledo.

References

 Article on Spanish Wikipedia
 Biographies of Cardinals

1546 births
1618 deaths
17th-century Spanish cardinals
Bishops of Pamplona
Bishops of Ciudad Rodrigo
Archbishops of Toledo
Grand Inquisitors of Spain
16th-century Roman Catholic archbishops in Spain
17th-century Roman Catholic archbishops in Spain
Bishops of Jaén
University of Salamanca alumni